The 2013 Dallas Tennis Classic was a professional tennis tournament played on hard courts. It was the second edition of the tournament which was part of the 2013 ATP Challenger Tour. It took place in Irving, Texas, United States between 11 and 17 March 2013.

Singles main-draw entrants

Seeds

 1 Rankings are as of March 4, 2013.

Other entrants
The following players received wildcards into the singles main draw:
  Robby Ginepri
  Alex Kuznetsov
  Philipp Petzschner
  Bobby Reynolds

The following players received entry from the qualifying draw:
  Denis Kudla
  Illya Marchenko
  Olivier Rochus
  Jimmy Wang

Doubles main-draw entrants

Seeds

1 Rankings as of March 4, 2013.

Other entrants
The following pairs received wildcards into the doubles main draw:
  Benjamin Becker /  Mischa Zverev
  Adham El-Effendi /  Darren Walsh
  Alex Pier /  Michael Russell

Champions

Singles

 Jürgen Melzer def.  Denis Kudla, 6–4, 2–6, 6–1

Doubles

 Jürgen Melzer /  Philipp Petzschner def.  Eric Butorac /  Dominic Inglot, 6–3, 6–1

References

External links
Official Website 

Dallas Tennis Classic
Irving Tennis Classic